Khirbat Sa'sa' was a Palestinian Arab village in the Haifa Subdistrict. It was depopulated during the 1947–1948 Civil War in Mandatory Palestine on April 28, 1948. It was located 15 km east of Haifa.

History
The Romans referred to the village as Kefar Sasai.

In 1881, the PEF's Survey of Western Palestine found at Kh. Sasa:  "caves and foundations."

British Mandate era
In the 1931 census of Palestine, conducted by the British Mandate authorities,  it was counted as a part of  Shefa-'Amr suburbs, together with 9 other  villages, and together they had a total of  1197 inhabitants, all Muslim, in  234 houses.

In the  1945 statistics  Sasa was again counted among  Shefa-'Amr  suburbs, and it was noted with a population of 130 Muslims.

Post 1948

In 1992 the village site was described: "Cactuses and fig trees can be found scattered about the site. There are a number of partially collapsed stone walls, one with a large arched opening.  The surrounding lands are used as a grazing area." Village ruins include building foundations, tombs, and cisterns.

References

Bibliography

External links
 Welcome To Sa'sa', Khirbat
 Khirbat Sa'sa',  Zochrot
Survey of Western Palestine, Map 5:    IAA, Wikimedia commons 

Arab villages depopulated during the 1948 Arab–Israeli War
District of Haifa